Plasmodium scelopori is a parasite of the genus Plasmodium subgenus Carinamoeba.

Like all Plasmodium species P. scelopori has both vertebrate and insect hosts. The vertebrate hosts for this parasite are reptiles.

Taxonomy 

The parasite was first described by Telford in 1977.

Description

The meronts measure 4-8 x 3-6 microns.

The merozoites are arranged in a fan like distribution. Pigment may be present in green-yellow clumps in the centre of the host cell.

The gametocytes are rounded.

Distribution 

This species is found in Belize, Costa Rica and Honduras.

Hosts 

This species infects the spiny lizards Sceloporus teapensis and Sceloporus varabilis.

References 

atheruri